Chris Chamberlain (born September 30, 1985) is a former American football linebacker. He was drafted by the St. Louis Rams in the seventh round of the 2008 NFL Draft. He played college football at Tulsa.

Early years
Chamberlain was a four-year letter winner and three-year starter at Bethany High School in Bethany, OK. He started at quarterback and free safety his final three years and led his team to a 13-2 record and the Class 2A state championship as a senior. He was named the District 2A-1 Player of the Year was First-team All-State. He rushed for 2,096 yards and 27 touchdowns his senior season and threw for 1,020 yards and 11 touchdowns from his quarterback position. On defense, he had 147 tackles and 10 interceptions. Chamberlain had career totals of 399 tackles and 20 interceptions and  rushed for 2,777 yards and 37 touchdowns, while completing 148-of-324 passes for 2,433 yards and 29 TDs in his career. His junior season totals were 108 tackles and eight interceptions, while rushing for 518 yards and 11 TDs, and passing for 1,006 yards and eight touchdowns. The Bronchos were 32-9 with Chamberlain at quarterback. He is considered the best football player to have ever played for the Bronchos.

Chris was also a standout basketball and baseball star in high school. His Senior year he averaged 8.6 points a game for the Bronchos and helped lead them to a 20-7 record. He was lead off hitter for the Bronchos baseball team due to his great speed. His Senior year he helped lead the Bronchos to the state tournament where they fell in the first round to Sulphur 9-8. It was also at Bethany that Chris met his high school sweet heart Amy Wilcox, whom he married on March 6, 2009 in Oklahoma City.

College career
As a senior at the University of Tulsa, Chamberlain played in 13 games and made 165 tackles (101 solo) with two sacks and three interceptions while being named First-team All-Conference USA. In 2006, as a junior, he was a Third-team All-Conference USA selection and had 51 tackles, 3.5  for losses and two interceptions. In 2005, he started all 13 games and had 88 tackles, and added 11 stops for losses and two forced fumbles and 4.5 sacks. He played in 11 games  in 2004 and started five contests as a true freshman and was credited with 48 tackles and 5.5 for losses and had three sacks.

Professional career

Pre-draft

St. Louis Rams
He was drafted by the Rams in the seventh round of the 2008 NFL Draft on April 27, 2008. On July 20, 2008, Chamberlain signed a three-year $1.186 million contract with the Rams. Chamberlain led the Rams in special teams tackles in 2008 with 19.

In 2009 Chamberlain was a backup outside linebacker who made one start and led the team in special teams tackles (28) for the second consecutive season. He made 13 starts during the 2011 Regular Season and made a career-high 80 tackles.

New Orleans Saints
Chamberlain signed with the New Orleans Saints on March 23, 2012. After tearing his anterior cruciate ligament (ACL), he was placed on injured reserve on August 19, 2012.  Attempting a comeback in 2013, he was again placed on injured reserve on August 27, 2013.  On September 3, 2013, the Saints released Chamberlain, using a "failure to disclose" designation that indicated Chamberlain had an undisclosed physical condition, so that the Saints would not be responsible for remaining financial obligations to Chamberlain.  Chamberlain's agent said he disagreed with this designation and would file a grievance to have the matter resolved.

References

External links
Tulsa Golden Hurricane's player page

1985 births
Living people
American football linebackers
New Orleans Saints players
People from Bethany, Oklahoma
Players of American football from Oklahoma
Sportspeople from Oklahoma County, Oklahoma
St. Louis Rams players
Tulsa Golden Hurricane football players